p21 is a cyclin-dependent kinase inhibitor.

P21 or P-21 may also refer to:

Proteins 
 p21/ras, part of the RAt Sarcoma family of proteins
 Transforming protein p21, encoded by the HRAS gene in humans

Vessels 
 , a minelayer and patrol ship of the Argentine Navy
 , a submarine of the Royal Navy
 , a patrol vessel of the Irish Navy
 , of the Armed Forces of Malta

Other uses 
 Curtiss XP-21, an American experimental fighter aircraft
 P21 road (Ukraine)
 Papyrus 21, a biblical manuscript
 Yao language
 Partnership for 21st Century Skills; see 21st century skills